James Angelo Baffico (born January 1, 1942) is an American television soap opera director, producer and occasional script writer. Born in San Francisco, California, has a Ph.D. from the University of Michigan, an M.A. and B.A. from the University of Nebraska. He is known for his role as "Bosko" in the 1983 Tom Cruise vehicle film All the Right Moves and as "Wooley" in George A. Romero's Dawn of the Dead. Baffico has produced films and written screenplays for Universal Studios, Vista, and Paramount Pictures.  He has been variously credited as Jim Baffico, James Baffico, and James A. Baffico.

Filmography

Positions held
All My Children
 Occasional Director (2004, 2005)
 Director (1993-1998; 2000-2004)

The Doctors
 executive producer (1981-1982)

Another World
 Producer/Director (1981-1985)

As the World Turns
 Director (1998-1999)

Days of Our Lives
 Director (1989; 2006- August 16, 2007)
 Occasional Director (2004, 2005, 2006)
 Occasional Script Writer (2003)

Awards and nominations
Daytime Emmy Award: 8
 Win: 1995 & 2003, Directing, All My Children
 Nomination: 1995-1999, 2001-2003, Directing, All My Children

References

External links
 

1942 births
University of Michigan alumni
University of Nebraska alumni
American soap opera writers
American television directors
American television producers
American male television writers
Living people
Soap opera producers
American soap opera directors